Francis William "Zud" Schammel (August 26, 1910 – January 1973) was an American football player, born in Waterloo, Iowa.  He played as a guard in the National Football League (NFL) with the Green Bay Packers during the 1937 NFL season.

References

1910 births
1973 deaths
American football guards
Green Bay Packers players
Iowa Hawkeyes football players
People from Tama County, Iowa
Sportspeople from Waterloo, Iowa
Players of American football from Iowa